Cindy Stollenberg (born 22 July 1976, Verviers, Liège, Belgium) is a retired Belgian rhythmic gymnast.

She represented Belgium in the individual rhythmic gymnastics all-around competition at two Olympic Games: in 1992 in Barcelona and in 1996 in Atlanta. In 1992 she was 39th in the qualification round and didn't advance to the final, in 1996 she was 31st in the qualification round and didn't advance to the semifinal.

References

External links 
 

1976 births
Living people
Belgian rhythmic gymnasts
Gymnasts at the 1992 Summer Olympics
Olympic gymnasts of Belgium
Sportspeople from Liège